Mazarredia is an Asian genus of ground-hoppers (Orthoptera: Caelifera) in the subfamily Metrodorinae and not assigned to any tribe.

Species 
Mazarredia includes the following species, in two subgenera:

subgenus Mazarredia Bolívar, 1887
Mazarredia lativertex Deng & Zheng, 2013 [temporary name]
Mazarredia annamensis Günther, 1939
Mazarredia arcusihumeralia Zheng, Li & Shi, 2003
Mazarredia bamaensis Deng, Zheng & Wei, 2007
Mazarredia bolivari Blackith & Blackith, 1987
Mazarredia brachynota Zheng, 1998
Mazarredia cervina (Walker, 1871)
Mazarredia chishuia Zheng & Li, 2006
Mazarredia consocia (Walker, 1871)
Mazarredia convexa Deng, Zheng & Zhan, 2010
Mazarredia convexaoides Deng & Zheng, 2015
Mazarredia cristulata Bolívar, 1902
Mazarredia curvimarginia Zheng, 1998
Mazarredia gemella Bolívar, 1887 - type species
Mazarredia gongshanensis Zheng & Ou, 2003
Mazarredia guangxiensis Deng, Zheng & Wei, 2007
Mazarredia heishidingensis Zheng, 2005
Mazarredia huanjiangensis Zheng & Jiang, 1994
Mazarredia hunanensis Zheng, 2014
Mazarredia hupingshanensis Zheng, 2014
Mazarredia interrupta Zheng, 2003
Mazarredia jiangxiensis Zheng & Shi, 2009
Mazarredia jinggangshanensis Zheng, 2014
Mazarredia jinxiuensis Zheng, 2003
Mazarredia lochengensis Zheng, 2005
Mazarredia longipennioides Zheng & Ou, 2010
Mazarredia longipennis Zheng, Jiang & Liu, 2005
Mazarredia longshengensis Zheng & Jiang, 1998
Mazarredia maoershanensis Zheng, Shi & Mao, 2010
Mazarredia medogensis Zheng, 2012
Mazarredia nigripennis Deng, Zheng & Wei, 2007
Mazarredia nigritibia Zheng & Ou, 2011
Mazarredia ophthalmica Bolívar, 1909
Mazarredia parabrachynota Zheng & Ou, 2010
Mazarredia planitarsus Hancock, 1907
Mazarredia platynota Zheng & Ou, 2010
Mazarredia rufipes Stål, 1877
Mazarredia serrifenzura Cao & Zheng, 2011
Mazarredia sfrictivertex Deng, Zheng & Wei, 2007
Mazarredia singlaensis Hancock, 1915
Mazarredia sobria Walker, 1871
Mazarredia torulosinota Zheng & Jiang, 2005
Mazarredia undulatimarginis Deng & Zheng, 2013
Mazarredia xizangensis Zheng & Ou, 2010
subgenus Prosoaltus Hancock, 1913
Mazarredia cephalica (Haan, 1843)

References

External links 
 

Tetrigidae
Caelifera genera
Orthoptera of Indo-China